Slaterville Springs is a hamlet (and census-designated place) in Tompkins County, New York, United States. Slaterville Springs has a post office with ZIP code 14881, which opened on August 8, 1823.

Mayor- Dan Barnes

References

Hamlets in Tompkins County, New York
Hamlets in New York (state)